Frederick Hugh "Old Eagle Eyes" Lehman (October 27, 1885 – April 12, 1961) was a Canadian professional ice hockey goaltender. He started his ice hockey career playing for the Pembroke Lumber Kings and the Berlin Dutchmen. In 1911, Lehman joined the New Westminster Royals, playing for the Royals for three seasons, before joining the Vancouver Millionaires in 1914. Lehman played half of his 22-year professional career with Vancouver, winning his only Stanley Cup; he would be unsuccessful in seven other attempts. In 1926, he joined the Chicago Black Hawks of the National Hockey League (NHL), playing a full season and splitting the second one as player and head coach. Although some ice hockey historians credit Jacques Plante for originating the practice, Lehman was the first goaltender to regularly pass the puck to his fellow forwards and defensemen; he even scored a goal by shooting the puck in the opponent's net while playing for the Professionals. He was inducted into the Hockey Hall of Fame in 1958.

Playing career

Lehman began his playing career in 1903–04, playing for the Pembroke Lumber Kings of the Ottawa Valley Hockey League (OVHL) for the first three seasons of his career. In the 1906–07 season, Lehman was signed as a free agent by the Canadian Soo of the International Professional Hockey League (IPHL); the IPHL was the first fully professional ice hockey league. Lehman returned to Pembroke for the 1907–08 season, appearing in four games. For the 1908–09 season, Lehman joined the Berlin Dutchmen of the Ontario Professional Hockey League (OPHL). In the 1909–10 season, Lehman was in two different Stanley Cup playoff series, with two different teams, the Berlin Dutchmen and the Galt Professionals, but he lost both times. During those playoff series, he appeared in three games, giving up 22 goals. Lehman played with the Berlin Dutchmen until 1911.

In 1911–12, Lehman played for the New Westminster Royals of the newly founded Pacific Coast Hockey Association (PCHA). He played three seasons for New Westminster, winning the league championship in his first season. In 1914–15, Lehman joined the Vancouver Millionaires of the PCHA. In his first season with the Millionaires, Lehman posted a 14–3 record, with a 4.08 goals-against average, which was a very good average in an era when goaltenders were not allowed to drop on their knees to make a save. In the Stanley Cup playoffs, Lehman helped the Millionaires become the first PCHA team to win the Stanley Cup, with a 3–0 record and 2.67 goals against average. This would be the only Stanley Cup victory of Lehman's career, as he was on the losing side in seven other attempts. The Millionaires squad consisted of seven future members of the Hockey Hall of Fame when they won the Cup: Lehman, Frank Nighbor, Cyclone Taylor, Si Griffis, Barney Stanley, Frank Patrick, and Mickey MacKay.

Lehman played with the Millionaires until the 1925–26 season. During that time, Lehman and some of his teammates were involved in a humorous incident when going back to Canada after an exhibition game against the Montreal Wanderers in New York City. In New York, Lehman's wife bought numerous women's designer outfits, after being treated to a shopping spree by him. When going back to Canada, Lehman, on the advice of Cyclone Taylor, who was both a professional ice hockey player and a Canadian immigration officer, split up all outfits among his teammates to avoid paying additional taxes he would have had to pay if he had brought all the clothing by himself at once; this puzzled the Customs officers. In 1922–23, the Millionaires were renamed the Maroons, and joined the Western Canada Hockey League (WCHL). The WCHL was renamed to the Western Hockey League in 1925–26; however, the league disbanded at the conclusion of that season. While playing for the Millionaires, Lehman appeared in six Stanley Cup finals, losing every time, except in his first season, in 1914–15.

Following the collapse of the WHL, Lehman joined the Chicago Black Hawks for the 1926–27 season. While in Chicago, Lehman mentored future Chicago goaltender and captain Charlie Gardiner. Lehman played one full season, and another four games the next one.  During the 1926 season, Lehman became the oldest goaltender to win his first NHL game at 41 years 21 days. This record was broken on February 22, 2020 by David Ayres who at 42 years, 194 days came into a game as an emergency backup goaltender for the Carolina Hurricanes against the Toronto Maple Leafs at Scotiabank Arena in the 2nd period and won the game 6-3.

Coaching career
During the 1927–28 season, Black Hawks owner and manager Frederic McLaughlin was sketching some plays for his team; after Lehman was shown the plays by McLaughlin, Lehman responded by calling it "the craziest bunch of junk [he's] ever seen". Expecting to be fired after that outburst, Lehman was later told to go to McLaughlin's office. It was how Lehman's playing career ended: McLaughlin appointed Lehman to be Chicago's new head coach. Lehman coached Chicago for part of one season, finishing with a 3–17–1 record over 21 games. He was replaced by Herb Gardiner the following season.

Playing style
As a goaltender, Lehman was a strong skater and good puckhandler. He chased down loose pucks, and was able to pass the puck to his forwards, surprising the other team's defenders. Playing in the OPHL, Lehman scored a goal by shooting the puck in the opponent's net. The first NHL goaltender to duplicate such a feat was Ron Hextall, who did it in 1987.

Legacy
After retiring from ice hockey, Lehman worked in the road construction business, eventually becoming the president of a paving company. Lehman was inducted into the Hockey Hall of Fame in 1958.

Career statistics

Regular season

Playoffs

* Stanley Cup Champion.

Coaching record

References

External links

 

1885 births
1961 deaths
Canadian ice hockey goaltenders
Chicago Blackhawks coaches
Chicago Blackhawks players
Hockey Hall of Fame inductees
Ice hockey people from Ontario
New Westminster Royals players
Sault Ste. Marie Marlboros players
Sportspeople from Pembroke, Ontario
Stanley Cup champions
Vancouver Maroons players
Vancouver Millionaires players
Canadian ice hockey coaches